Thermodesulfobium  is a Gram-negative, strictly anaerobic, moderately thermophilic, non-spore-forming and non-motile genus of bacteria from the family of Thermodesulfobiaceae.

See also
 List of bacteria genera
 List of bacterial orders

References

Further reading 
 
 
 
 

 

Thermoanaerobacterales
Bacteria genera
Thermophiles
Anaerobes